Arash Dajliri (born January 19, 1999, in Tonekabon) is an Iranian footballer who plays as a right-back for Iranian club Naft Gachsaran.

Club career

Esteghlal
He made his debut for Esteghlal in 25th fixtures of 2019–20 Persian Gulf Pro League against Sanat Naft while he substituted in for Vouria Ghafouri.

Havadar
On 30 September 2021, Arash Dajliri moved to Havadar on loan from Esteghlal.

References

External links 
 

Living people
1999 births
Association football defenders
Iranian footballers
Esteghlal F.C. players
Havadar S.C. players
People from Tonekabon
Sportspeople from Mazandaran province